Bee at the Beach is a 1950 animated short film featuring Donald Duck.  It was released by Walt Disney Productions.

Plot
Donald sets up for a day at the beach right over the same spot that a bee has settled in for a relaxing day. The angry bee then goes after Donald, including, among other things, stinging the inflatable raft that Donald is using in the water and putting him in danger in shark-infested waters.

Voice cast
Clarence Nash as Donald Duck

Home media
The short was released on December 11, 2007 on Walt Disney Treasures: The Chronological Donald, Volume Three: 1947-1950.

References

External links
 
 

1950 short films
1950 animated films
1950s Disney animated short films
American comedy short films
Donald Duck short films
Films produced by Walt Disney
1950s English-language films
American animated short films
Films about ducks
Films about bees
RKO Pictures short films
RKO Pictures animated short films
Films directed by Jack Hannah
1950s American films
Films set on beaches
Animated films about birds